Lucy Cary (1619 – 1650) was an English Benedictine nun and biographer.

Biography
Lucy Cary was born in 1619 to Henry Cary, 1st Viscount Falkland, and Elizabeth Cary. She was fourth of eleven children and one of her sisters was Anne Cary, the writer. Cary's mother converted to Catholicism in 1626 and Cary converted in 1634, guided by Father John Fursdon, their mother's confessor. Cary was sent to Flanders. She joined the 'Our Lady of Consolation' convent at Cambrai 31 August 1638 and professed in 1640. Cary wrote a biography of her mother entitled The Lady Falkland: Her Life by One of Her Daughters. Cary died in Flanders on 1 November 1650.

Sources

1619 births
1650 deaths
17th-century French nuns
British women biographers
English Benedictines